Dyad or dyade may refer to:

Arts and entertainment
 Dyad (music), a set of two notes or pitches
 Dyad (novel), by Michael Brodsky, 1989
 Dyad (video game), 2012
 Dyad 1909 and Dyad 1929, ballets by Wayne McGregor

Other uses
 Dyad (biology), a pair of sister chromatids
 Dyad (philosophy), used by the Pythagoreans for the number two, representing "twoness" or "otherness"
 Dyad (sociology), a group of two people
Grizzled Young Veterans, also known as The Dyad, a British professional wrestling tag team

See also
 Dyadic (disambiguation)
 Diad, in cell biology
 Dryad (disambiguation)
 Dyad pedagogy, a goal-directed teaching method
 Dyad symmetry, in genetics
 Triad (disambiguation) ("group of 3")